The Northern Ireland Junior national football team, commonly referred to as Northern Ireland Juniors, represents Northern Ireland in international association football matches for teams selected outside national professional leagues. Originally selected on an all-Ireland basis, the team is now limited to selecting players appearing in intermediate and junior leagues within Northern Ireland. A number of players have graduated from the Junior international side to the senior international side, notably Norman Uprichard and Dick Keith who played at the 1958 World Cup. The most recent player to graduate to the senior team was Stuart Dallas.

History
Ireland Juniors played their first representative match against Scotland in 1890. The Scots became the primary opponents for Ireland Juniors through to the 1990s with only occasional matches against Wales and the Republic of Ireland for variety.

Today
The main competition for junior level national teams in Europe is the UEFA Regions Cup. Northern Ireland Juniors first entered in 2000 but a change in the rules mean that since 2007 the national team has been unable to enter and a regional select has entered in its stead. Since this change the Eastern Region have been the representatives five times and the Western Region once having won a play-off.

In addition Northern Ireland Juniors regularly compete in the International Quadrangular Tournament along with Scotland, the Republic of Ireland and the Isle of Man. Northern Ireland have won this competition three times, in 1995, 1996 and 2017.

Current squad
The following players were selected for the Junior International Quadrangular Tournament held in Glasgow, Scotland from 11–14 October 2017.

Competition Records

UEFA Regions' Cup

Since 2007, Northern Ireland has been represented by the winner of a play-off between the Eastern Region1 and Western Region2.

Quadrangular Tournament

1 A Mid Ulster side represented Northern Ireland

References

Juniors
UEFA Regions' Cup